Michel d'Ornano (12 July 1924 – 8 March 1991) was a French politician.  A descendant of both Marie Walewska and Philippe Antoine d'Ornano, he began his political career as mayor of Deauville in 1962.  He served as president of the General Councils of both Calvados and Basse-Normandie before going on to represent the fourth district of Calvados in the Parliament of France; in that body he sat first as an Independent Republican and later with the Union for French Democracy.  He served in numerous cabinet positions under Valéry Giscard d'Estaing, including as Secretary of State for Ecology, the Minister of Culture, and Minister of Industry.

D'Ornano was married to Anne d'Ornano, who he installed as mayor of Deauville; after his death, in 1991, she became president of the Regional Council of Calvados.

1924 births
1991 deaths
Politicians from Paris
Politicians of the French Fifth Republic
French Ministers of Culture
French people of Polish descent
Mayors of places in Normandy
People from Deauville
French people of Corsican descent
French Ministers of the Environment
Lycée Carnot alumni
Road incident deaths in France